Nur Shazrin binti Mohamad Latif (born 2 February 1998) is a Malaysian competitive sailor. She won two gold medals at the 2015 Southeast Asian Games.

She competed at the 2016 Summer Olympics in Rio de Janeiro, in the women's Laser Radial. She won a bronze medal in Laser Radial at the 2018 Asian Games in Jakarta. She competed at the 2020 Summer Olympics in Tokyo 2021, in Laser Radial.

References

External links 
 

1998 births
Living people
People from Johor
Malaysian female sailors (sport)
Olympic sailors of Malaysia
Sailors at the 2016 Summer Olympics – Laser Radial
Sailors at the 2014 Summer Youth Olympics
Southeast Asian Games gold medalists for Malaysia
Southeast Asian Games silver medalists for Malaysia
Southeast Asian Games bronze medalists for Malaysia
Southeast Asian Games medalists in sailing
Asian Games medalists in sailing
Sailors at the 2018 Asian Games
Medalists at the 2018 Asian Games
Asian Games bronze medalists for Malaysia
Competitors at the 2015 Southeast Asian Games
Competitors at the 2017 Southeast Asian Games
Competitors at the 2019 Southeast Asian Games
Sailors at the 2020 Summer Olympics – Laser Radial
20th-century Malaysian women
21st-century Malaysian women